

References

 01
Roraima
History of Roraima